For Sure is an album led by trumpeter Woody Shaw which was recorded in 1979 and released on the Columbia label.

Reception

Scott Yanow of Allmusic stated, "There are originals performed by Shaw, Singh, Willis, and Lewis, but it is the trumpeter's feature on "We'll Be Together Again" with the strings that ends up being most memorable".

Track listing 
All compositions by Woody Shaw except as indicated
 "We'll Be Together Again" (Carl T. Fischer, Frankie Laine) – 5:44
 "OPEC" – 5:24
 "Time Is Right" (Judi Singh) – 4:27
 "Ginseng People" – 5:30
 "Why?" (Victor Lewis) – 4:51
 "Joshua C." – 7:11
 "Isabel the Liberator" (Larry Willis) – 8:27
 "Teotihuacan" (Stafford James) – 7:15 (on Woody Shaw: The Complete Columbia Albums Collection only)
Recorded at the CBS 52nd Street Studio B in New York City on December 17 (tracks 3 & 5), December 18 (track 7), December 20 (track 4), and December 27 (tracks 1 & 2), 1979 with overdubbed strings recorded on January 4, 1980
For Sure! was reissued on Woody Shaw: The Complete Columbia Albums Collection in 2011.

Personnel 
Woody Shaw – trumpet, flugelhorn
James Spaulding – flute (tracks 3, 5 & 7)
Gary Bartz – alto saxophone (tracks 2, 3, & 5–7)
Carter Jefferson – soprano saxophone, tenor saxophone (tracks 3–8)
Curtis Fuller – trombone (tracks 3–7)
Steve Turre – trombone, bass trombone (tracks 2, 3, 5 & 7)
Larry Willis – piano
Stafford James – bass
Victor Lewis – drums
Naná Vasconcelos – percussion (tracks 3, 5 & 7)
Judi Singh – vocals (tracks 3 & 5)
Gayle Dixon, Winterton Garvey – violin (tracks 1 & 3)
Maxine Roach, Veronica Salas – viola (tracks 1 & 3)
Akua Dixon, Richard Locker – cello (tracks 1 & 3)

References 

Woody Shaw albums
1980 albums
Columbia Records albums
Albums produced by Michael Cuscuna